The vessel Stena Paris is a chemical tanker owned and operated by CM P-Max 1 Ltd. The cargo ship was built in 2005 in Brodosplit Shipyard, Croatia. The vessel has deadweight of 65,125 DWT and gross tonnage of 36,064. The chemical tanker Stena Paris is large and has improved capacity for cargo on board. The net tonnage is 36,064 NT and on board there are 10 cargo tanks with capacity for 70,200 cub m.

Ship Engineering 
The ships main engines are two MAN B&W 6S46MC-C with total power of 21.000 hp.  In addition on board there are four diesel generators MAN B&W 7L23/30H, which support the propulsion system and cargo handling equipment. 
The cargo system consists of 10 cargo deepwell pumps. All of the pumps have capacity 800 cubic meters per hour. The heating system on board contains 3 heating coils SS SUS316L.

Ships News 
This year on 6 August 2014 the crew of Stena Paris entered into the news by saving an elderly Swedish couple from their dismasted yacht near the Cook Islands. The Rescue Coordination Centre New Zealand (RCCNZ) detected a beacon alert from the yacht Blue Horizon. The couple, a 69-year-old woman and 70-old-man, feared the broken mast would hole the hull. The chemical tanker was close to the accident and saved the two seafarers.

References

Merchant ships of Bermuda
Chemical tankers
Ships built in Croatia
2005 ships